Tomas Vytautas Raskevičius (born 6 January 1989) is a Lithuanian liberal politician, Member of the Seimas, and LGBT+ rights activist. Raskevičius holds degrees in political science and law. He is the 2nd openly homosexual member of the Seimas after the late Rokas Žilinskas.

Biography 

In 2007 Raskevičius graduated from Kaunas University of Technology Gymnasium. In 2011 he graduated from the Institute of International Relations and Political Science of Vilnius University with a bachelor's degree in political science, in 2012 he graduated from the Central European University in Hungary with a master's degree in human rights law.

In 2012–2013, he worked in the Lithuanian Gay League as a project manager, and in 2015–2018 he worked there as a lawyer and public policy coordinator. In 2014, he worked as an event coordinator at the LGBT+ Community Center in Brooklyn, New York, USA. In 2018-2020, he was the Head of the Equal Opportunities Integration Division in the Office of the Equal Opportunities Ombudsperson.

In March 2019, he was elected to the Vilnius City Municipality Council. In June of the same year, he participated in the founding of the Freedom Party, where he currently holds the position of Deputy Chairman of the Party Leader and a member of the Board. He ran with the party in the 2020 Lithuanian parliamentary election, in the Naujamiestis and Naujininkai electoral district and multi-member constituency where he was elected.

Since 2020, Tomas Vytautas Raskevičius is the Chairman of the Human Rights Committee of the Seimas.

He is also actively involved in the LGBT+ movement in Lithuania, and was one of the main organizers of the Baltic Pride march "For Equality!" (2013, 2016). In addition, he initiated a strategic litigation process, after which the identity documents of transgender persons in Lithuania can be changed without mandatory medical procedures (in 2017). Raskevičius has also represented the applicants in the European Court of Human Rights in the case "Beizaras and Levickas v. Lithuania" (hate speech on the social network "Facebook").

Political activities 

When he ran for parliament, Tomas Vytautas Raskevičius stated in his political agenda that one of his main political goals was the adoption of the Gender-neutral civil partnership bill.
The bill was registered on May 21, 2021.

During the submission stage, Seimas did not approve the draft of the Gender-neutral civil partnership bill. 63 members of parliament voted in favour of the drafted law, 58 voted against and 7 abstained. The bill was returned to the initiator for improvement.

It is planned to resubmit the Gender-neutral civil partnership bill to Seimas for consideration in the autumn session of 2021.

Raskevičius also works on the abolition of the MSM blood ban, drafting the Law on Recognition of Gender Identity to establish the principles of non-discrimination of transgender people and removing discriminatory aspects of the Law on the Protection of Minors from the Negative Impact of Public Information.

In February 2021, a group of people called for the resignation of Raskevičius from the position of the chairman of the Seimas Human Rights Committee and claimed to have collected more than 300,000 signatures. As it turned out later, the vast majority of these signatures were fake, and the group acknowledged that their petition had no real legal force.

Personal life 

Tomas Vytautas Raskevičius is unmarried, because legal recognition of same-sex couples is not legalized in Lithuania. He has a son, Nathan Thomas. Raskevičius' hobbies include theater, sports, literature, popular queer culture.

Awards 

He received the 2018 National Equality and Diversity Award for his work in the field of protection of human rights of LGBT+ persons

References

1989 births
21st-century Lithuanian politicians
Gay politicians
Living people
Members of the Seimas
Politicians from Kaunas
Vilnius University alumni